Cugy refers to the following places is Switzerland:

 Cugy, Vaud
 Cugy, Fribourg